The Mark of the Angels – Miserere is a 2013 French thriller film directed by Sylvain White and based on Jean-Christophe Grangé's 2008 novel . Headlined by Gérard Depardieu and JoeyStarr, the film is the fifth adaptation of a Grangé novel after The Crimson Rivers, Empire of the Wolves, The Stone Council and Flight of the Storks and the first for which Grangé himself did not collaborate on the screenplay.

The film, which benefitted from a large budget, deals with a series of mysterious murders, Nazism, private military companies and child abuse. It was poorly received by critics and failed to make an impact at the box office.

Plot
In Paris, Lionel Kasdan, a retired BRI commander desperate to come back to action, investigates the strange murder of Wilhelm Goetz, a choir master and Chilean refugee found dead in his church with his eardrums blown out, surrounded by bloody children's footprints. Meanwhile, Captain Frank Salek, an Interpol agent on the verge of being suspended due to his erratic behavior, is on the trail of a secret organization specialized in kidnapping children. When he learns of Goetz's death, he establishes a link with his own investigation and reluctantly agrees to team up with Kasdan.

Cast
 Gérard Depardieu : Lionel Kasdan
 JoeyStarr : Frank Salek
 Rüdiger Vogler : Franz Hartmann
 Helena Noguerra : Angela Colson
 Marthe Keller : Laura Bernheim
 Thierry Lhermitte : Vernoux
 Ivan Franěk : Vargos
 Thom Hoffman : Sean Singleton
 Corinne Masiero : Monique Mendez
 Mathieu Carrière : Peter Hansen
 Jimmy Jean-Louis : Puyferrat
 Lizzie Brocheré : Dounia
 Fatima Adoum : Journalist

Production

Development
The Mark of the Angels – Miserere marks Franco-American director Sylvain White's first French film, as all his prior works are American productions. Producer  claims he specifically looked for a foreigner to helm the picture, as he felt a French director would be unable to properly adapt Jean-Christophe Grangé's work to the screen. White praised the novel, saying Grangé transcribed the feeling and atmosphere of his universe very clearly, and was given a 15 million Euro budget, culled from French, Belgian and German production companies.

Casting
Gérard Moulévrier served as the casting director for the film. Gérard Depardieu plays the widowed retired cop Lionel Kasdan while rapper-turned-actor JoeyStarr plays his reluctant hot-headed partner Frank Salek. Starr's character was significantly changed from the novel, where he was a Child Protection Unit agent of Russian ethnicity called Cédric Volokine, a far cry from Starr's Martinican origins. Similarly, Kasdan's Armenian origins are highlighted in the novel but go unmentioned in the film. In an interview promoting the film, Sperry said Depardieu was among the only three or four bankable French actors that could play a retired policeman, and that he was the first to be approached. Sylvain White says that while he was unsure if partnering up Depardieu and Starr would be very easy or very hard on set, he knew it would one way or the other make for an interesting pairing. Starr admits being nervous at acting opposite the celebrated thespian, but says Depardieu immediately put him at ease and that their partnership was very comfortable, without egos coming into play, going on to call the older actor a paternal figure and mentor of sorts. Depardieu himself compared Starr to his deceased son. Starr hadn't read any of Grangé's novels upon being sent the script, being familiar only with the prior film adaptations. He proceed to watch all of Sylvain White's films before meeting him, much to White's surprise.

Among the supporting cast, Belgian actress Helena Noguerra plays Salek's Interpol direct supervisor and his former partner and lover Angela Colson. Like Starr, Noguerra was unfamiliar with Grangé's work and was attracted to the role as it was different than what was usually sent her way. Swiss actress Marthe Keller plays Laura Bernheim, a Chilean activist of German origin dedicated to fighting evil in all its forms. Keller had notably acted in Marathon Man, a 1976 film that heavily influenced Jean-Christophe Grangé to write the novel. German actor Rüdiger Vogler plays Franz Hartmann, one of the film's antagonists, Mathieu Carrière plays Peter Hansen, a Chilean activist that Kasdan and Salek consult, Haitian Jimmy Jean-Louis as a crime scene investigator who keeps Kasdan in the loop of things and Thierry Lhermitte plays Vernoux, Kasdan's former boss in charge of the official investigation. TF1 news anchor Claire Chazal has an extended role as herself, appearing throughout the film in news reports regarding Blackstream, an Academi-style private military company, and interviewing Marthe Keller's character, Dutch actor Thom Hoffman plays Sean Singleton, Blackstream's CEO and Lizzie Brocheré has a role as a lawyer Kasdan and Salek question.

Filming
Principal photography began on March 26, 2012, and lasted for 55 days with the Alexa Studio, making it the first French film to use the camera. An incident occurred on the very first day of shooting when a stuntman lost control of his motorcycle and fell in the Seine. Sylvain White described the film as very different from anything he'd done from before and was very hand-on throughout filming, even acting as the camera operator for some shots. The film was shot almost entirely on location, approximately 60% in and around Paris, 30% in Belgium and Germany and 10% in Morocco. The École d'Architecture Marne-la-Vallée in Champs-sur-Marne was used for the interiors of Interpol's Lyon headquarters, while the Assumption Colony's concert hall was shot in the French Communist Party's headquarters in Paris, which has been used in many other films, including two others in 2013, such as Mood Indigo. In addition the Church of Saint-Séverin served as the location for the first murder, a scene between Depardieu and Keller occurs at the Paris–Le Bourget Airport, Depardieu investigates at the Mémorial de la Shoah and the bar "Aux Folies"  in Belleville, while is apartment is located at Les Olympiades. Emmy-winning production designer  worked on the film. A physiotherapist was present on the set in case of injuries. A fight scene in a hospital involving JoeyStarr required a full day's shoot. The Mark of the Angels – Miserere is majoritarily in French, with some subtilted Arabic dialogue in the Moroccan opening and a significant amount of English and German as well as some Spanish in the third act.

Music

British composer Max Richter was hired for the film's score. He'd notably previously composed the score for Sarah's Key, directed by Gilles Paquet-Brenner, whose previous film Walled In was co-written by Sylvain White. White also uses the tune Through Tears of Joy, by Orchestra Lunatica, which he'd previously used in his previous film The Losers. Gregorio Allegri's religious chant Miserere gives its title to the book, and was moved as a subtitle for the film. The piece plays into the plot and as such is used throughout the picture. A digital download release of the soundtrack was released on June 24, 2013, on the Kuskus label and can be purchased on platforms such as Amazon UK and iTunes.

Release

Promotion
Pathé released a 48-second teaser trailer on February 28, 2013, before unveiling the full trailer a month and a half later on March 14. In addition, Pathé made five minute-long excerpts available online a month before the film's release and the novel was retitled and given a new cover on June 13 to tie into the film. Ducati used the film to promote its Ducati Diavel motorcycle, driven by JoeyStarr's character. Depardieu was slated for an interview with i-Télé journalist Elena Volochine while working on Turquoise, but it never occurred as when Volochine arrived, the actor called her a "bitch" and told her to "go fuck herself".

Theatrical run
The film saw a wide release in France on June 26, 2013, in 280 theaters, which dropped to 267 in its second week. Uncharacteristically, the film wasn't released simultaneously in Belgium and is instead expected to premiere in the country on September 4. Sales are handled by Pathé International.

Reception

Box office performance
The film made 397,163 Euros in its opening weekend, debuting at the tenth spot in the French box office, the third highest-grossing of the week's new releases after Despicable Me 2 and The Internship. By the end of the first week, 113,494 tickets had been sold. Sales plummeted in the second week, dropping 52.7%, with the film falling down to the fifteenth spot, bringing the total gross to 944,818 Euros, with only 36,189 additional moviegoers. To date, less than 150,000 tickets for the film have been sold.

Critical response

The Mark of the Angels – Miserere received mixed, mostly negative reviews from critics, with AlloCiné'''s aggregator granting a 1.9 on 5 average based on 8 reviews. Common positive points include the chemistry between Gérard Depardieu and JoeyStarr and the action scenes while common negative points include a lack of suspense and a silly, incoherent script. Several reviewers also pointed out similarities to The Crimson Rivers, the first screen adaptation of a Grangé novel.

Among the most positive was from Télé 7 Jours critic Viviane Pescheux, who was disappointed by the ending but enjoyed the "spectacular" action scenes and the pairing of Gérard Depardieu and JoeyStarr and from Jean-Pierre Lacomme in Le Journal du Dimanche, who also praised the leads and called the film "as solid as it is efficient". For RTS Info, Caryl Bussy was also quite positive about the two stars and opined that fans of the novel wouldn't be disappointed. Hubert Lizé of Le Parisien also enjoyed the pairing but felt the film paled in comparison to Grangé's novel  and ultimately fell flat. In , Michael Ghennam appreciated the film's 1970s atmosphere but thought it offered no surprises. Writing for Metro, Mehdi Omaïs thought the adaptation was scholarly, incoherent and lacked suspense. Conversely, Ecran Large's Laurent Pécha says he was pleasantly surprised, praising the two leads and the editing and comparing the film favorably to past Grangé adaptations. Julien Welter of L'Express conceded that the film started well, but felt it eventually turned into a "silly esoteric hodgepodge", a sentiment echoed by Télérama critic Nicolas Didier. In TéléCinéObs, Sophie Grassin gave Sylvain White credit for some "more or less spectacular" action scenes but was disappointed he didn't do much with his actors. Similarly, Charles Martin lamented in La Voix du Nord the missed opportunity of having Deparideu and Starr together, deeming the film "cold and passionless". Writing for Le Monde, Jacques Mandelbaum was particularly negative, calling the script dated, the dialogue awkward, the directing flat and the actors lost, likening the end result to a shipwreck.

In the sole English language review, for The Hollywood Reporter, Jordan Mintzer called the film a "mildly entertaining, extremely heavy-handed conspiracy thriller [...] that, despite some lively performances, never congeals into a convincing whole", praising Gérard Depardieu and JoeyStarr, along with the editing, cinematography and a couple of action scenes but concluded that "White never builds a palpable sense of danger or enough staggering set-pieces to add substance to all the recycled goods".

See also
Colonia Dignidad, the real life organization which inspired the Colony in the film and novel
Paul Schäfer, the founder of Colonia Dignidad
Josef Mengele, the Nazi war criminal who served as inspiration for the film's villain, along with SchäferMarathon Man, a 1976 film the novel's author Jean-Christophe Grangé was inspired by, also starring Marthe KellerMiserere'', Gregorio Allegri's 17th century music piece that plays an important part in the film and the novel

References

External links
 
 

2013 films
2013 crime thriller films
2010s Arabic-language films
2010s French-language films
2010s German-language films
2010s Spanish-language films
Films scored by Max Richter
Films based on French novels
Films based on thriller novels
Films set in Brussels
Films set in Lyon
Films set in Morocco
Films set in Paris
Films shot in Belgium
Films shot in Germany
Films shot in Morocco
Films shot in Paris
French crime thriller films
Police detective films
Films directed by Sylvain White
2010s English-language films
2013 multilingual films
French multilingual films
Spanish-language French films
2010s French films